Sandra Zaiter (November 21, 1943 – September 25, 2022) was a Dominican-born Puerto Rican actress, children's television show host, singer, composer and athlete.

Early life and career

Zaiter was born in the Dominican Republic to Maronite Christians of Lebanese ancestry. Early in her life, she participated in church groups, and established her residence in Puerto Rico.

Zaiter participated in the Puerto Rican production of Arriba la Gente. Before she began her television career, Zaiter won the local OTI Festival as a composer. Soon started, her television career took off in the late 1970s, when she began recording children's albums as a singer, as well as hosting the Puerto Rican version of Romper Room on WRIK-TV, until the station closed temporarily. She later moved to WKAQ-TV, where she starred, produced, wrote, and hosted, alongside Lou Briel and Dagmar, a children's show called Teatrimundo, and later Telecómicas. She was the spokesperson for the Muscular Dystrophy Association (MDA) in Puerto Rico, and a sponsor of the association's telethon. In the 1990s, Puerto Rican actress and producer Ángela Meyer wrote and produced a drama mini-series based on Zaiter's life, titled Gaviota de la Esperanza (Seagull of Hope) and broadcast by Telemundo.

Zaiter hosted a weekly show on WIPR-TV called Contra Viento y Marea (Against Wind and Tide), aimed to provide guidance and assistance to the disabled. Zaiter did many public appearances throughout her life, and participated in the yearly presentation of the Sandra Zaiter Award to those who have distinguished themselves helping the disabled. The studio where Día a Día con Raymond y Dagmar is broadcast at WKAQ-TV in Puerto Rico is named after Zaiter since the premiere of the mid-day show in 2007.

Paralyzed by accident
Zaiter was an experienced diver and swimmer until suffering a life-threatening accident in the 1970s after misjudging the depth of the water at night, hitting her head on a rock during a dive at a beach in Fajardo, Puerto Rico. The accident paralyzed her, and she used a wheelchair since.

See also

List of television presenters
List of composers by nationality

References

Sources

External links
 Fundación Nacional para la Cultura Popular
 
 

1943 births
2022 deaths
Puerto Rican Maronites
20th-century Puerto Rican actresses
Puerto Rican women composers
Puerto Rican composers
20th-century Puerto Rican women singers
Puerto Rican people of Lebanese descent
Puerto Rican singer-songwriters
Puerto Rican television personalities
Dominican Republic emigrants to Puerto Rico
Dominican Republic people of Lebanese descent